Jonathan Mark Buckland (born 11 September 1977) is an English-born Welsh musician and songwriter best known as the lead guitarist and co-founder of the rock band Coldplay. Raised in Pantymwyn, he began to play guitar from an early age, being influenced by acts such as the Stone Roses, My Bloody Valentine and U2. Noted for sparse and delicate arrangements, he uses the slide bar and delay pedal with a stylistic chiming and ringing timbre that led to comparisons with the Edge.

Buckland has a degree in astronomy and mathematics at University College London, where he formed Coldplay with Chris Martin, Guy Berryman and Will Champion. The group signed with Parlophone in 1999, finding global fame through the release of Parachutes (2000) and subsequent records. He won seven Grammy Awards and nine Brit Awards as part of Coldplay. The band have sold over 100 million albums worldwide as of 2021, making them the most successful group of the 21st century.

Early life
Jonathan Mark Buckland was born on 11 September 1977 in Islington, London, England, being the second child of high school teacher John Buckland and his wife Joy. The family moved to Pantymwyn, Flintshire, Wales when he was four years old. He attended Ysgol y Waun primary school, while secondary education was held at Alun School, learning guitar notes and chords in the former and taking A-level music lessons on the latter. His teacher, Margaret Parr, mentioned that Buckland was "always extremely interested" on the subject and had particular strength for composition. He listened to numerous Jimi Hendrix and Eric Clapton records owned by his parents during his childhood, being encouraged to attain further experience on the guitar by his brother Tim, who introduced him to My Bloody Valentine, Sonic Youth, the Stone Roses, George Harrison, U2 and other similar artists.

Before that, when Buckland was seven years old, he had piano lessons but did not enjoy them. At 10 years old, he was part of a rap group and experimented with computer music using beats consisting of dog barks. He joined the Scouts when he was 11 years old and mentioned still liking the uniform in 2008. He then added that, one night when his friends were playing on a field, they had an encounter with an angry sheep which ran over and attacked him multiple times. The experience caused him to not wear wool or eat lamb since then. In October 2019, he remembered taking a holiday job at North Wales' Daily Post which consisted on placing photos of houses for sale in the pressings. His education was continued at University College London, where he attained a 2:1 degree in astronomy and mathematics and formed Coldplay with Chris Martin, Guy Berryman and Will Champion.

Career

Coldplay

Buckland was responsible for co-founding the band along with Martin; they met each other during UCL's orientation week in 1996. Both resided at the university's Ramsay Hall, where Champion mentioned there were "a lot of musicians and a lot of show-offs", but "Jonny was not one of those show-offs", he further added that "the bloke who turned out to be the best guitarist out of all of us was the bloke who had his guitar hidden in his cupboard and who never got it out or was pushy about his guitaring". Martin stated meeting Buckland was "like falling in love". They began to write their first songs together in early 1997 and practised every night. By November of that year, Berryman had already joined them and the trio was called Big Fat Noises. Champion completed the line-up in 1998.

The previous group name was dropped when Champion scheduled their debut live performance at The Laurel Tree only a few days after he became part of the band, with Starfish being chosen "in a panic". In Coldplay, Buckland is usually regarded as quiet, friendly, unassuming and "the wise owl" of the group. During an interview, Martin commented spending his "entire life trying to drag him out of the shadows, because I know that he is a guitar hero – to me anyway". The band used his bedroom for rehearsals in their early years, being near the neighbors who "were able to tolerate the noise". They stated in 2019 that Buckland is usually the first to either disapprove or give his input on Martin's initial song ideas, although he was responsible for starting tracks like "Adventure of a Lifetime" on his own, which was released as the lead single for their seventh album A Head Full of Dreams (2015). Despite not being the group's most prominent backing vocalist, he can be heard in many songs and provided lead vocals in "Don't Panic", the opening track of Parachutes (2000).

Other projects
Buckland guest starred on Ian McCulloch's third album, Slideling (2003), by playing guitar in "Sliding" and "Arthur". He also made a cameo appearance along with Martin on the comedy horror film Shaun of the Dead (2004). The pair later recorded "Beach Chair" for Jay-Z's ninth album, Kingdom Come (2006), and were featured in Slashed (2010), an independent horror film directed by Northern Irish band Ash. In 2019, he assisted Jodie Whittaker in her cover of "Yellow" for BBC's Children in Need along with Champion.

Musical style
Buckland usually uses a Fender 72' Telecaster Thinline, which is known to have a fuller sound compared to the usual models. He is occasionally seen with Jazzmaster, Jaguar and Gibson ES-335 guitars as well; the latter was used when Coldplay recorded A Rush of Blood to the Head (2002). While he has two Fender Hot Rod DeVille amplifiers, there are conflicting reports on whether they are the 2x12 or 4x10 version. His pedals include Fulltone OCD, which is used for boost; the Electro-Harmonix Micro POG, Pro Co RAT (vintage model) and Ibanez TS9 Tube Screamer, which are combined for distortion; the BOSS RV-3 for reverb; and BOSS TR-2 for tremolo. He also makes extensive use of the Line 6 DL4 pedal, while a MXR Phase 90 can be heard at the end of the song "Fix You". His favourite Coldplay guitar riff is "Hurts Like Heaven".

Noted for sparse and delicate arrangements, Buckland has stated that "I've never gone in much for the solos. I was always more interested in atmospherics. Listening to bands like Mercury Rev, My Bloody Valentine, or even the Verve, the way those guitarists played. There's no Van Halen in me". His use of slide bar have a stylistic chiming and ringing timbre which led to comparisons with U2's the Edge, who commented during an interview at Glastonbury that "Jonny is an inspiration to guitar players everywhere, I am proud to know that I was one of his main influences. It makes me feel like a real rock star". In 2020, he shared on social media playlists with some of his favourite tracks and artists from each decade, including the Velvet Underground, Carole King, Joy Division, Talking Heads, Kate Bush, Donna Summer, Björk, Beastie Boys and many others.

Personal life
According to The Times, Buckland has an estimated wealth of £113 million as of May 2022. He is a lifelong supporter of Tottenham Hotspur. After being vegetarian for a few years, he gave up while traveling to Japan, where he was not able to communicate his options to the waiters and was served beef, finding out "he really liked it". However, he still does Meat Free Mondays along with his bandmates. In 2007, his older brother Tim founded alternative rock group The Domino State, which supported Coldplay at the O2 Arena shows from Viva la Vida Tour. He married jewelry designer Chloe Lee-Evans in 2009. The couple have two children.

The family currently resides in the Hampstead area of Camden, London, but they also own two apartments in Manhattan, New York. Buckland purchased the first of them for $3.4 million in 2008, while the second was bought for $4.5 million in 2016. He is godfather to Martin's daughter Apple along with English actor Simon Pegg. During an interview for BBC Radio 2, he mentioned that his favourite non-musical activity is reading books. His great-grandfather formed a band named Big Buckland's Dance Orchestra between the late 1910s and early 1920s, a photograph of them was used as an inspiration for the album cover and vintage aesthetics of Everyday Life (2019).

Discography

With Coldplay

 Parachutes (2000)
 A Rush of Blood to the Head (2002)
 X&Y (2005)
 Viva la Vida or Death and All His Friends (2008)
 Mylo Xyloto (2011)
 Ghost Stories (2014)
 A Head Full of Dreams (2015)
 Everyday Life (2019)
 Music of the Spheres (2021)

Solo credits
 Slideling (2003) – guitarist
 Kingdom Come (2006) – guitarist

See also
 List of people associated with University College London
 List of British Grammy winners and nominees
 List of best-selling music artists
 List of highest-grossing live music artists
 List of artists who reached number one on the UK Singles Chart
 List of Billboard Hot 100 number-ones by British artists

Notes

References

Further reading

External links

 
 Coldplay Official Website
 Coldplay on AllMusic

1977 births
Living people
20th-century British guitarists
20th-century English male musicians
20th-century Welsh musicians
21st-century British guitarists
21st-century English male musicians
21st-century Welsh musicians
Alternative rock guitarists
Alternative rock keyboardists
Alumni of University College London
Atlantic Records artists
British alternative rock musicians
British male songwriters
British multi-instrumentalists
Capitol Records artists
Coldplay members
English male guitarists
English multi-instrumentalists
English pop guitarists
English rock guitarists
English rock keyboardists
English songwriters
Parlophone artists
People educated at Alun School, Mold
People from Islington (district)
People from Mold, Flintshire
Welsh guitarists
Welsh keyboardists
Welsh multi-instrumentalists
Welsh rock guitarists
Welsh songwriters